Charles Julius Solomon (March 12, 1906 – May 1, 1975) was an American bridge player, administrator, writer, and sponsor. He was Inducted into the ACBL Hall of Fame in 2000.

Biography

Solomon was from Philadelphia, Pennsylvania and an attorney, though he eventually left law to play bridge full-time. In 1948, he married Margery "Peggy" Golder (née Mastbaum), the daughter of philanthropist Jules Mastbaum. Peggy was recently widowed following the death of her first husband, U.S. Congressman Benjamin M. Golder (1891–1946) and was looking for someone to teach her the game; he soon became her bridge mentor and eventually her husband. She became the third female ACBL Life Master and they were the subjects of a newspaper feature in 1960, "The Solomons: Top Married Bridge Team".

In world championship  competition, Solomon was a member of the 6-man USA squad in the 1956 Bermuda Bowl. Not yet a tournament, it was a long head-to-head match between representatives of North America and Europe, won by France.

Charles Solomon died in Philadelphia, aged 69. He was survived by his wife and two stepdaughters, Joan Golder Ash and Norma Golder Brunswick.

Published books  

 No Trump Bidding (Woodstown, NJ: Seven Stars Press, 1947), 48 pp. – "Rev., enl. ed." – 
 Slam Bidding and Point Count, Solomon and Bennett L. Disbrow (Philadelphia: Macrae Smith, 1951), 281 pp., 
 How to Bid and What to Lead, Solomon and Disbrow (Macrae Smith, 1953), 128 pp., 
 Hold Our Bridge Hands, Solomon and Bert Wilson (Philadelphia: Lefax Publ., 1969), 140 pp.,

Bridge accomplishments

Honors 

 ACBL Hall of Fame, 2000

Wins

 North American Bridge Championships (14)
 Master Individual (1) 1947 
 von Zedtwitz Life Master Pairs (1) 1946 
 Wernher Open Pairs (1) 1943 
 Marcus Cup (1) 1967 
 Mitchell Board-a-Match Teams (2) 1952, 1965 
 Chicago Mixed Board-a-Match (3) 1949, 1950, 1959 
 Reisinger (4) 1937, 1938, 1939, 1944 
 Spingold (1) 1955

Runners-up

 North American Bridge Championships
 Master Individual (1) 1943 
 von Zedtwitz Life Master Pairs (1) 1938 
 Rockwell Mixed Pairs (1) 1961 
 Silodor Open Pairs (2) 1959, 1968 
 Hilliard Mixed Pairs (1) 1943 
 Nail Life Master Open Pairs (1) 1963 
 Open Pairs (1928-1962) (1) 1956 
 Vanderbilt (2) 1954, 1958 
 Mitchell Board-a-Match Teams (2) 1955, 1960 
 Chicago Mixed Board-a-Match (2) 1939, 1940 
 Reisinger (2) 1953, 1959 
 Spingold (1) 1939

References

External links
 
 
 

1906 births
1975 deaths
American contract bridge players
Bermuda Bowl players
Contract bridge writers
People from Philadelphia
20th-century American lawyers
Mastbaum family